Kamalakanta Jena is an Indian educator, popular science and science text book writer in Odia. He has received awards for his books and articles.

Early life and education
Jena was born on 25 April 1971 in village Januganj in Balasore district of Odisha State. He graduated from Januganj M. E. School in 1983 and completed matriculation from Remuna High School in Remuna, Balasore in 1986. He passed matriculation in the First division, securing a record mark (88%) in second language English in his H.S.C. Examination. 

He stood 3rd in India National Mathematical Olympiad (Regional Level) Examination in 1987 while continuing with +2 Science at F. M. College, Balasore. He worked as Editor of "The South", the annual magazine of South Hostel, F. M. College, for the academic year 1990–91.He received his graduation degree from F. M. College  under Utkal University in  1991 in Physics with honours.  

Jena was an MSc student in the P. G. Department of Physics at Utkal University in Vani Vihar, Bhubaneswar from 1991 through 1993. He worked as Editor of The Vanisourav, the annual magazine of Godavarish Hostel, Utkal University  for the academic year 1992–93After completing his degree with First class (Second position in Utkal University), he became a Junior Research Fellow in the Regional Research Laboratory in Binhubaneswar. He qualified IIT – GATE and CSIR – NET.

Profession
At age 28, Jena started working at the OES (Orissa Education Service) under the Department of Higher Education. In 1999, he started his teaching career at the Department of Physics, Government College in Sundargarh, Orissa. He served for approximately 15 years at  the Government College and the Government Women's Junior College in Sundargarh. 

Since 2013, Jena has been working with the Department of Physics, Bhadrak Jr/Auto College in Bhadrak, Orissa.

Articles
Jena started reporting in 1986 at age 15 for The Chalachitra Jagat, a Cine magazine published in Cuttack. His first article was published in the Oriya daily The Sambad on 8 December 1991. 

Jena has published over 700 articles in publications like The Prajatantra, The Samaja, The Samaya, The Dharitri, The Pragativadi, Bigyanaloka (Orissa Bigyan Prachar Samiti), Sansar, Meena Bazar, Nandan Kanan, Shisulekha, Sishu Prativa, Pourusha, Yojana, Akshay Urja, NBT Bulletin, Emerging Science,  and The Statesman, Science Reporter (NISCAIR).  Jena is a Life Member of Orissa Bigyan Academy and has contributed articles to the academy publications "Bigyan Academy" and "Science Horizon". 

Jena has also published humour/satirical articles in Haribol, Rabibara Samaja, Dharitri Chhutidina, Sambad, Byangabaani, Manorama, Tikie Hasa, Pragatibaadi, Lavanya, Teerataranga, Parichaya, Time Pass, and Byanga Darabar. He has published under the name Adhapoka. 

Jena works as associate editor, DIGBALAYA, Orissa Physical Society, Bhubaneswar. He represented Orissa Chapter as a prominent science communicator in the 99th Indian Science Congress of 2012 held in KIIT University, Bhubaneswar.

Radio 
Jena is a speaker on popular science in radio talk programmes.

Books

Science books 

 Kathaare Kathaare Bigyan (Pragati, Sundargarh),
 Barshaa Bijulira Khela (Vidyapuri, Cuttack),
 Chhota Nuhen Chhota Kathaa (Nalanda, Cuttack, selected by State Library),
 Big Bang Machine (The Book Point, Bhubaneswar),
 Gapare Gapare Bigyan (The Book Point, Bhubaneswar), Awarded by Orissa Bigyan Academy in 2011
 Barshaa Bijuli Ghadaghadi (Vidyapuri, Cuttack),
 0Anapaaramparika Shakti (Holy Faith International, Cuttack),
 Gachha Lataara Gahana Kathaa (Holy Faith International, Cuttack)

,

Text Books 

 Environmental Education (+2, Vidyapuri, Cuttack),

 Paribesha Shiksha (+2, Vidyapuri, Cuttack),
 Practical Physics (+2, Nalanda, Cuttack),
 Ama Bigyan – Class I (Holy Faith International, Cuttack),
 Ama Bigyan – Class II (Holy Faith International, Cuttack),
 Ama Bigyan – Class III (Holy Faith International, Cuttack),
 Ama Bigyan – Class IV (Holy Faith International, Cuttack),
 0Ama Bigyan – Class V (Holy Faith International, Cuttack)
 Barsa Bijulira Khela
 Paribesa Sikhya
 Solar cells grow thinner, but glow brighter

, 

Awards
Jena received the Orissa Bigya Academy Award for 2011 for his story book Gapare Gapare Bigyan on popular science.

Other awards:

 Award for Innovative Teaching Physics, 2012 Kendriya Vidyalaya, Sundargarh
 Pranakrushna Parija Popular Science Award, 2011, Orissa Bigyan Academy, Bhubaneswar
 Parashamanee Sammana, 2011, Parashamanee Magazine, Baripada
 Padmacharan Smruti Sammana, 2011, Ispat Sahitya Sansad, Rourkela
 Janapriya Bigyan Puraskar, 2010, Bigyan Prachar Samiti, Cuttack
 Telingibaza Bigyan Sammana, 2009, Telingibaza Magazine, Rourkela
 Chandrama Prabandha Sammana, 2009, Chandrama Magazine, Anugul
 Sishu-Sahitya Sammana, 2008, Sishu-Sahitya Sansad, Keonjhar
 Laabanya Saraswat Sammana, 2008, Laabanya Magazine, Sundargarh
 Naba Pratibha Sammana, 2008, Biswa-Sahitya Seva Sangha, Ctc
 Prakruti Bandhu, 2007, Government of Orissa
 Utkal Prabha, 2007, Neelachakra Prakashan, Puri
 Bigyan Lekhaka Sammana, 2007, SCART, Cuttack
 Abhinandan Pratibha Sammana, 2006, Abhinandan Newspaper, Balasore
 Tiki Kaincha Pratibha Sammana, 2006, Tiki Kaincha Magazine, Bolangir
 Gopinath Mohanty Pratibha Puraskar, 2005, Bigyan Prachar Samiti
 Best Graduate, 1991,  Rotaract Club, Bhadrak

 Felicitated by Ispat Sahitya Sansad.

References

Publications 
 Jena, Kamalakanta. Thoughts on Doomsday Catastrophe in 2012. Science Horizon. Orissa Bigyan Academy. July 2011.

1971 births
Living people
People from Balasore
Indian male journalists
Journalists from Odisha
Indian lecturers
Indian science journalists